This tournament started on 26 February 2019 with preliminary round.

Preliminary round
Played on 26 and 28 February 2019

Round of 16
Played on 19 and 21 March 2019

Quarterfinals
Played on 29, 30 and 31 March 2019

Top goalscorers
In bold, players that continue active in the competition.

References 

Saint Kitts and Nevis
Football in Saint Kitts and Nevis